Miami Undercover is an American crime drama series that aired in broadcast syndication from January to October 1961 for a total of 38 episodes. The series stars Lee Bowman (who had previously played sleuth Ellery Queen on television) and boxer-turned-actor Rocky Graziano. Most episodes were shot on location in Miami.

Synopsis
Jeff Thompson is a private investigator. He and his sidekick Rocky are hired by local hotel owners to fight crime and "keep trouble out of Miami".

Cast
 Lee Bowman as Jeff Thompson
 Rocky Graziano as Rocky

Episodes

References

External links
 

1961 American television series debuts
1961 American television series endings
1960s American crime drama television series
Television shows set in Miami
Black-and-white American television shows
English-language television shows
First-run syndicated television programs in the United States
Television series by Ziv Television Programs
Television series by United Artists Television